The Mosler MT900 is a sports car that was built in the United States and the United Kingdom by Mosler Automotive.

Three submodels were produced. The MT900R was a racing version of the MT900. The basic car was updated as the MT900S for 2005, with the MT900S Photon being an optional performance package. The original MT900 was introduced in 2001 and the MT900S finished production in May 2011. Components for 25 MTs were produced as of January 2005, though only about 35 road cars and 50 racing versions have officially been completed (c.20 of which are MT900S). The MT900 was the replacement for the Mosler Raptor.

MT900

The MT900 was designed by Rod Trenne, who previously worked on the Corvette C5. The initials were for Mosler, Trenne, and the car's 900 kilogram (1984 lb) target weight.

The MT900 used a carbon-fiber chassis with a LS6 V8 engine mounted amidships, powering the rear wheels. A ZF transaxle, designed for Porsche, was mounted upside down to allow the engine to sit in front of the rear axle.

The MT900 pulled 1.02 g on the skidpad.

The car had a somewhat plain exterior designed for aerodynamics, with a low 0.25 coefficient of drag. List price was US$164,000. Sales were certainly slow, and only a single prototype was produced.

MT900R

Introduced at the same time as the basic MT900 was the race-ready MT900R. It was designed for use in various international motorsports series for an estimated price of $119,000. The MT900R made its competition debut at the 2001 24 Hours of Daytona, and would be campaigned by a factory Mosler team for the full season of the Grand American Road Racing Championship. The entry finished the year ninth in their class championship.

For 2002, the French Perspective Racing team would become the full-season entry in Grand American and saw an improvement in performance. At Daytona the MT900R finished 13th overall and fifth in their class before winning at the next round at Homestead-Miami Speedway, helping the team to third in the championship. Rollcentre Racing and Balfe Motorsport (with aid from Rollcentre) would bring the Moslers to Europe in 2003, starting the British GT Championship year strong with three straight one-two finishes, before finishing the year with four more victories. The Rollcentre squad edged out Balfe for the championship that year. In Grand American, the Moslers were moved to the faster GTS class, but Perspective Racing improved on the previous year's Daytona effort with a ninth-place finish and the class victory. Mosler Automotive would take one more victory that season.

Martin Short's Rollcentre Racing team also took their MT900R to a second-place finish in the inaugural Bathurst 24 Hour in 2002 at the famous Mount Panorama Circuit in Bathurst, Australia. Rollcentre backed this up in the 2003 race with a fifth-place finish. The MT900R proved very quick on the circuit's Mountain and Conrod Straight's (both over 1 km in length), with Short finding he was able to match the speed of the Holden Monaro 427C's which used an Australian developed version of the larger 7.0L (427cui) V8 engine used in the Chevrolet Corvette C5-R's at Le Mans, as well as the 6.0L V12 powered Lamborghini Diablo GTR.

Rollcentre and Balfe would continue in the British GT Championship in 2004, although Balfe would also enter the Spanish GT Championship. The Moslers would struggle in British GT and score no wins, but Balfe was able to earn two victories in Spanish GT, winning the drivers' championship by a mere point. 2005 would see Balfe entering the FIA GT Championship, although the car was not homologated and could not fight for points. Rollcentre would go on to win the Britcar 24 hours at Silverstone. Escuderia Bengala and Escuderia Motor Terrasa would compete in Spanish GT, while Eclipse Motorsport and Cadena GTC took over British GT competition.

MT900 GT3
Launched in late 2006, the Mosler MT900 GT3 was an attempt by Rollcentre Racing to adapt the MT900R for compliance to the new FIA GT3 category used in various championships. However, the lack of production Moslers led to the FIA rejecting the homologation and forcing Rollcentre to turn elsewhere. The car is allowed into the International GT Open, Australian GT Championship and Belcar series along with the British GT championship which runs to GT3 rules, but has not been approved for other series which use the GT3 category. MT900R GT3's use the LS7 7.0L V8 (427cui) rather than the LS1 5.7L (350cui) version from the original MT900R.

MT900S

The car weighs  without fuel.

An early prototype MT900S, despite being up  and down  from the production version, posted a 0-60 mph time of 3.5 seconds and a quarter-mile time of 12 seconds flat.

A newer edition with  accelerated  in 3.1 seconds in a Car and Driver test in early 2006.

In June 2005, Mosler announced that they had reached EPA and California Air Resources Board (CARB) certification on the MT900S, allowing road car sales to begin in the United States. The price was set at $189,000 with two examples having been built as of January 2005. George Lucas took delivery of the first street-legal MT900S in December 2006.

Engine
 Type: supercharged and intercooled V-8, aluminium block and heads
Bore x stroke: 
Displacement: 
Compression ratio: 10.5:1
Fuel-delivery system: Multi-point fuel injection
Supercharger: Eaton, Roots type
Maximum boost pressure: 
Valvetrain: pushrods, 2 valves per cylinder, hydraulic lifters
Power (SAE net):  @ 6300 rpm
Torque (SAE net):  @ 4000 rpm
Redline: 6500 rpm

Drivetrain
Transmission: 6-speed manual 
Final-drive ratio: 3.44:1, limited slip 
Gear, Ratio, mph/1,000 rpm, Speed in gears 
I, 3.82, 6.1,  (6500 rpm) 
II, 2.15, 10.9,  (6500 rpm) 
III, 1.56, 15.0,  (6500 rpm)
IV, 1.21, 19.4,  (6500 rpm) 
V, 1.00, 23.4,  (6500 rpm) 
VI, 0.85, 27.6,  (6500 rpm)

Acceleration

: 3.1 s 
: 6.5 s 
: 13.8 s 
Street start, : 3.7 s 
Top-gear acceleration, : 4.7 s 
Top-gear acceleration, h: 3.8 s
Standing : 11.0 s at  
Top speed (redline limited):

Photon

As of January, 2011, a second Photon had been built and was sold for use in the United Kingdom.

MT900SGT

In 2010, Mosler announced they would release a facelifted version of MT900, based on the MT900M which participated in 2010 Super GT season. A rendering was made of the facelifted MT900 which was as far as the redesign progressed. In May 2011 production was stopped and the factory closed down.

MT900M

In 2010 Super GT season, the MT900M made its debut at the second round of the season in Okayama by Thunder Asia Racing, a GT300 team based in Singapore. Unlike the other MT900 entered in previous Super GT seasons, it uses a 3.4-liter V8 Judd-powered engine and an aero kit specified for the GT300 class regulations.

Citations

General and cited references

External links
 
 Australian GT Championship Mosler

2010s cars
Cars introduced in 2001
Cars discontinued in 2011
MT900
Rear mid-engine, rear-wheel-drive vehicles
Sports cars